Seville East is a town in Victoria, Australia, 46 km north-east of Melbourne's central business district, located within the Shire of Yarra Ranges local government area. Seville East recorded a population of 837 at the 2021 census.

Its post office opened on 5 July 1954 and closed in 1969.

References

Towns in Victoria (Australia)
Yarra Valley
Yarra Ranges